The People's Republic of Stokes Croft (PRSC) is a community organisation based in the Stokes Croft area of Bristol, England. It was launched 22 September 2007, by founding member and current chairman Chris Chalkley.

Its main aim is to "provide benefit to The Community by promoting the interests of the area", which include creativity, culture and the local economy. The mission of the PRSC is to help Stokes Croft to recognise its special qualities, by improving the streetscape through direct action, and creating a sense of identity.

It has been successful in getting local people involved in how their area is developed, and encouraging and commissioning street art which has improved the appearance of formerly derelict buildings. The People's Republic of Stokes Croft rent studio space to local artists, filmmakers, and media creators. The organisation is 'leading efforts to protect this unique area of Bristol from the creeping gentrification that's slowly making most of urban Britain look like a paved shopping centre forecourt.'

The PRSC is partially funded by Stokes Croft China, 35 Jamaica Street. This shop sells bespoke English fine bone china, which is decorated in Stokes Croft with salvaged ceramic transfers combined with the art and politics of Stokes Croft. The china is produced by local artists on a voluntary basis. Stokes Croft China's customers have included Stanley Donwood, Bristol City Museum and Victoria and Albert Museum  

In 2011, a poster commemorating the recent riots in the area was created by local artist Banksy, with some of the proceeds of its sale going towards the PRSC.

References

Organisations based in Bristol